Tropical Storm Dianmu was a weak tropical cyclone that struck Leizhou Peninsula, China and Northern Vietnam in mid August 2016. It was the eighth named storm of the annual typhoon season.

Meteorological history

The disturbance was located within a narrow area of low vertical windshear and had a good outflow. Over the next day the system's low level circulation centre started to consolidate as it moved westwards, before it was classified as a tropical depression by the Japan Meteorological Agency (JMA) during August 15. Over the next couple of days the system moved gradually westwards, before the JTWC issued a tropical cyclone formation alert on the system during August 17.

The depression was named Dianmu by the JMA during August 18, after it had developed into a tropical storm, while the JTWC initiated advisories on the system and classified it as Tropical Depression 11W. After being named, Dianmu continued to move westwards under the influence of a subtropical ridge of high pressure located to the north of the system and made landfall on China's Leizhou Peninsula. The system subsequently entered the Gulf of Tonkin later that day, where it developed an eye feature on microwave imagery, before it peaked with sustained winds of 75 km/h (45 mph) as it made landfall on northern Vietnam during August 19. Over the next day Dianmu gradually weakened as it moved westwards through Vietnam, Laos and China's Yunnan province, before it degenerated into an area of low pressure over northern Myanmar during August 20. The remnant area of low pressure continued to be monitored, as it moved through parts of Myanmar and India, before it was last noted over Bangladesh.

Preparations and impact

China
As Dianmu moved slowly westwards, local winds over Hong Kong strengthened during that day, before the Strong Wind Signal No. 3 was issued for both territories, by the Hong Kong Observatory and the Macao Meteorological and Geophysical Bureau. Strong winds were subsequently observed over Hong Kong, before all signals were cancelled during August 18.

On Hainan Island, around 40 000 people were evacuated, ahead of the system affecting the island while transportation service were also affected. Heavy rain associated with the system caused flooding in several places over the island, including in parts of the capital Haikou.

In total, Dianmu killed 6 people, and total economic losses in Mainland China were counted to be CN¥3.18 billion (US$480.9 million).

Vietnam
Within Vietnam, 17 people were killed, while two others were missing. Over in Quảng Ninh, a total of 11 houses were collapsed. Total damages in the country amounted to 1.99 trillion VND (US$89 million).

See also 
 Typhoon Hope (1979)
 Tropical Storm Zita
 Tropical Storm Soudelor (2009)
 Tropical Storm Mujigae (2009)
 Tropical Storm Bebinca (2013)

References

External links 

2016 Pacific typhoon season
Typhoons in Vietnam
Typhoons in China
Typhoons in Laos
Tropical cyclones in Myanmar
August 2016 events in Asia
2016 disasters in Vietnam
2016 disasters in China
Dianmu